The 1984 Philippine Basketball Association (PBA) 2nd All-Filipino Conference was the second conference of the 1984 PBA season. It started on August 5 and ended on November 4, 1984. This is the second All-Filipino tournament of the season.

Format
The following format will be observed for the duration of the conference:
The teams were divided into 2 groups.

Group A:
Northern Consolidated (NCC)
Crispa Redmanizers
Gold Eagle Beer
Tanduay Rhum

Group B:
Great Taste Coffee
Gilbey's Gin Tonics
Beer Hausen
Country Fair Hotdogs

Teams in a group will play against each other once and against teams in the other group twice; 11 games each.
The top two teams after the eliminations will advance to the semifinals outright.
The Remaining six teams will play in a best-of-three quarterfinal series (pairings were decided by the league) to determine the other three teams that will qualify into the next round. 
The top two teams after the two-round semifinals will face each other in a best-of-five championship series. The next two teams will play for a best-of-five playoff for third place.

Classification round

Quarterfinals

(3) Crispa vs. (5) Gold Eagle

(4) Gilbey's vs. (7) Tanduay

(6) Beer Hausen vs. (8) Country Fair 

Beer Hausen, Crispa and Tanduay won their respective series to enter the semifinal round.

Semifinals

Third place playoffs

The Finals ended in three games, earlier than the third place playoffs. The league aborted the series, awarding Tanduay third place by virtue of leading the series 2–1 before the series was aborted.

Finals

References

PBA Philippine Cup
All-Filipino Conference 2